Nor Kesaria is a town in the Armavir Province of Armenia. The town was founded in 1949 as a state farm for geranium oil extraction.

See also 
Armavir Province

References 

World Gazeteer: Armenia – World-Gazetteer.com

Populated places in Armavir Province
Populated places established in 1949
Cities and towns built in the Soviet Union